Autism: Explaining the Enigma is a book published by psychologist Uta Frith.

This book provided the first satisfactory psychological account of what happens in the mind of a person with autism. The book proposed that the key problems for autistic people were an inability to recognize and think about thoughts (theory of mind), and an inability to integrate pieces of information into coherent wholes ("weak central coherence", WCC). The book outlines neuropsychological research on autism.

See also 
 Cognitive psychology

References

External links 
 List of the editions on Google Books
 
 

Books about autism
1989 non-fiction books